Maylon Turner Hanold (born September 13, 1963 in Charleston, South Carolina) is an American slalom canoeist who competed from the late 1980s to the early 1990s. She won a bronze medal in the K-1 team event at the 1987 ICF Canoe Slalom World Championships in Bourg-Saint-Maurice. She also finished 25th in the K-1 event at the 1992 Summer Olympics in Barcelona.

References
Sports-Reference.com profile

1963 births
American female canoeists
Canoeists at the 1992 Summer Olympics
Living people
Olympic canoeists of the United States
Medalists at the ICF Canoe Slalom World Championships